Pokagon State Park is an Indiana state park in the northeastern part of the state, near the village of Fremont and  north of Angola. It was named for the 19th-century Potawatomi chief, Leopold Pokagon, and his widely known son, Simon Pokagon, at Richard Lieber's suggestion. The  park has an inn, camping facilities, and a staff of full-time naturalists. Pokagon receives nearly 640,000 visitors annually.

Overview
The park is bordered by Lake James on the west and south and Snow Lake on the north. Various wetlands can be seen throughout the park, and the Potawatomi Nature Preserve makes up a large portion of its east side. Over  of hiking trails wind through the park.

The Wisconsin Glacier, the last of the ice age's four glaciers that covered Indiana, created the rolling terrain found in Pokagon. Glaciation's influence can be seen in many of the features of the park, including Lake Londiaw (a kettle lake), Hell's Point (a kame), and various glacial erratics.

The toboggan run is a popular destination during the winter.

History
Pokagon State Park was created in 1925. Through fundraising efforts, the citizens of the county purchased the first , much of it farmland, on the shores of Lake James. In 1927, the newly christened Potawattomi Inn opened its doors. In 1934, Pokagon Boy's Camp opened in what is now the State Park's group camping area; many of the camp's buildings have been repurposed for their current uses.

It was listed on the National Register of Historic Places in 1995.

Civilian Conservation Corps
In 1934, chapter 556 of the Civilian Conservation Corps (CCC) arrived at Pokagon. During the ensuing eight years, the CCC constructed many of the best-known buildings at Pokagon including the Gate House, the Spring Shelter, the Saddle Barn, the first three incarnations of the toboggan run, and, not least, the CCC Shelter, a National Register of Historic Places site. Behind the Beach House, the land quickly rises to a bluff overlooking the lake.

The CCC also planted trees—sometimes in precise lines—and created roads and trails. They even published their own newsletter, the Pokagon Chieftain. The CCC was instrumental in transforming Pokagon into the rustic park it is today.

Presently the park contains . Efforts were made to secure a property across the street from Pokagon. It was officially transferred in June 2007. It will be managed by Pokagon State Park and called Trine State Recreation Area.

Potawatomi Inn
The Potawatomi Inn opened in 1927 only two years after the park was created. The Inn contained 40 guest rooms, the dining room and the Lonidaw Lounge. Along the south of the dining room, was an open porch, overlooking Lake James. A room cost $3 for the night.  In the 1960s additional rooms were added to the west. The original rooms were equipped with bathrooms and the long porch on the south was enclosed to create a sunny area overlooking the lake. During the 1980s a swimming pool with an outdoor deck was added on the south side of the new wing. Increased demand allowed for the park to expand in the 1990s and in 1995 the conference center opened with additional guest rooms.

Nature preserves

Potawatomi Nature Preserve
Located across the eastern half of the park, it is accessible from three separate trails, (#3, #6, #9). This is a varied environment of marsh, hardwood forests, pine forest and sand hills.

Beechwood Nature Preserve
Located outside the park on its northeastern corner, the preserve is accessible from Trail 8.  A  loop trail covers the old meadows.  The area is become covered by gray dogwood and other pioneer woody plants.  The area features yellow birch, red maple, blue beech, and skunk cabbage. The remnants of an old apple orchard may still be visible.  Access is also available from State Road 127.

Fish and wildlife

The common fish found in Lake James include: yellow perch, largemouth bass, northern pike, bluegill, rock bass, and spotted gar.

Beavers, coyotes, and foxes can be found in this park.

Pokagon and its surrounding lakes are the home for a variety of birds. Common birds such as ducks, geese, gulls, and purple martins can be found when the lake is not frozen. Migrating birds such as loons, grebes, and double-crested cormorants can also be observed by visitors, typically during autumn.  Hawks and red-headed woodpeckers can be seen year around, as can barred and great horned owls. Several bald eagles were sighted on the lake in 2006. Other birds that can be observed by visitors including brown creepers, veeries, several types of warblers, bluebirds, Carolina wrens, Baltimore orioles, and pileated woodpeckers.

Amphibians include: mud puppies, salamanders, and frogs

The common reptiles include: the garter snake, the eastern massasauga, the hognose snake, the northern water snake, plus the painted turtle, snapping turtle, and the soft shell turtle. All of which are available to see at the nature center.

Facilities and activities
 Bicycle trail
 Hiking trails
 Pokagon Interpretive Center
 Picnicking
 Playground equipment
 Swimming / beach
 Sand volleyball court
 Saddle barn
 Fishing
 Boating
 Potawatomi Inn
 Cabins
 Meeting and conference facilities
 Reservable shelters
 Camping - reservations recommended
 Electric hookup 200 sites
 Non-electric 73 sites
 Youth tent areas
 Group camp
 General store
 Dumping station
 Winter activities
 Toboggan run
 Cross-country skiing
 Ice fishing

Equipment rentals
 Pontoon boats
 Paddleboats
 Rowboats
 Toboggan (weekends only, in season)
 Ski rental (winter)
 Horse-back riding (seasonal)

See also
 List of Indiana state parks

References

External links 
Indiana Department of Natural Resources' official Web page
 Pokagon Google Map
 Potawatomi Inn - State Park Features - Local Attractions

State parks of Indiana
Protected areas established in 1925
Civilian Conservation Corps in Indiana
Protected areas of Steuben County, Indiana
Historic districts on the National Register of Historic Places in Indiana
1925 establishments in Indiana
National Register of Historic Places in Steuben County, Indiana
Parks on the National Register of Historic Places in Indiana